Lhota is the most common name of villages in the Czech Republic. It may refer to:

Places in the Czech Republic
Municipalities

Lhota (Kladno District), in the Central Bohemian Region
Lhota (Prague-East District), in the Central Bohemian Region
Lhota (Přerov District), in the Olomouc Region
Lhota (Zlín District), in the Zlín Region
Balkova Lhota, in the South Bohemian Region
Bílá Lhota, in the Olomouc Region
Bradlecká Lhota, in the Liberec Region
Červená Lhota, in the Vysočina Region
Chodská Lhota, in the Plzeň Region
Dlouhá Lhota (Blansko District), in the South Moravian Region
Dlouhá Lhota (Mladá Boleslav District), in the Central Bohemian Region
Dlouhá Lhota (Příbram District), in the Central Bohemian Region
Dlouhá Lhota (Tábor District), in the South Bohemian Region
Francova Lhota, in the Zlín Region
Haškovcova Lhota, in the South Bohemian Region
Horní Lhota (Ostrava-City District), in the Moravian-Silesian Region
Horní Lhota (Zlín District), in the Zlín Region
Hroznová Lhota, in the South Moravian Region
Hurtova Lhota, in the Vysočina Region
Husí Lhota, in the Central Bohemian Region
Jestřabí Lhota, in the Central Bohemian Region
Kacákova Lhota, in the Hradec Králové Region
Kamenná Lhota, in the Vysočina Region
Klášterská Lhota, in the Hradec Králové Region
Králova Lhota (Písek District), in the South Bohemian Region
Králova Lhota (Rychnov nad Kněžnou District), in the Hradec Králové Region
Lhota pod Hořičkami, in the Hradec Králové Region
Lhota pod Libčany, in the Hradec Králové Region
Lhota pod Radčem, in the Plzeň Region
Lhota Rapotina, in the South Moravian Region
Lhota u Lysic, in the South Moravian Region
Lhota u Olešnice, in the South Moravian Region
Lhota u Příbramě, in the Central Bohemian Region
Lhota u Vsetína, in the Zlín Region
Lhota-Vlasenice, in the Vysočina Region
Malá Lhota, in the South Moravian Region
Nedašova Lhota, in the Zlín Region
Nová Lhota, in the South Moravian Region
Ostrožská Lhota, in the Zlín Region
Ovesná Lhota, in the Vysočina Region
Písková Lhota (Mladá Boleslav District), in the Central Bohemian Region
Písková Lhota (Nymburk District), in the Central Bohemian Region
Podhradní Lhota, in the Zlín Region
Podkopná Lhota, in the Zlín Region
Prosenická Lhota, in the Central Bohemian Region
Rabštejnská Lhota, in the Pardubice Region
Radkova Lhota, in the Olomouc Region
Salačova Lhota, in the Vysočina Region
Šárovcova Lhota, in the Hradec Králové Region
Smetanova Lhota, in the South Bohemian Region
Suchá Lhota, in the Pardubice Region
Tvarožná Lhota, in the South Moravian Region
Uhlířská Lhota, in the Central Bohemian Region
Úhřetická Lhota, in the Pardubice Region
Velká Lhota, in the Zlín Region
Vlachova Lhota, in the Zlín Region
Vranová Lhota, in the Pardubice Region
Vrbová Lhota, in the Central Bohemian Region
Vysoká Lhota, in the Vysočina Region
Zábeštní Lhota, in the Olomouc Region
Zářecká Lhota, in the Pardubice Region
Zelenecká Lhota, in the Hradec Králové Region

Castle
Červená Lhota Castle, in the South Bohemian Region

People
Antonín Lhota, Czech painter
George Lhota, American slalom canoeist
Joe Lhota, American public servant and politician

Buildings
William J. Lhota Building, a historic office building in Columbus, Ohio, United States

See also
Lhotka (disambiguation)